Xola Nqola (born 12 August 1986) is a South African politician from the Eastern Cape. In 2019 he became a Member of Parliament (MP) for the African National Congress.

Parliamentary career
Nqola became a parliamentary candidate for the African National Congress in the 2019 general elections. He appeared seventh on the ANC's Eastern Cape list, thus qualifying for a seat in National Assembly as the ANC won 18 list seats in the province. On 22 May 2019, Nqola was sworn in as a Member of Parliament.

He became a member of the Portfolio Committee on Justice and Correctional Services, a member of the Constitutional Review Committee and an alternate member of the Portfolio Committee on International Relations and Cooperation on 27 June 2019.

In October 2019, Nqola proposed that Kholeka Gcaleka be shortlisted as a candidate for interviews for the position of deputy public protector.

On 7 April 2021, Nqola became a non-voting member of the Ad hoc Committee on the Section 194 Enquiry, which will determine if Public Protector Busisiwe Mkhwebane should be removed from office or not.

References

External links
Profile at Parliament of South Africa

Living people
1986 births
Xhosa people
People from the Eastern Cape
African National Congress politicians
Members of the National Assembly of South Africa